Hugues IV de Châteauneuf, Lord of Châteauneuf and Sorel, was a 13th-century French noble.

Life 
Born in 1185, Hugues de Châteauneuf was the eldest son of Gervais II de Châteauneuf and Marguerite de Donzy. In 1212 he married Eléonore de Dreux, daughter of Robert II of Dreux, Count of Dreux and Yolande de Coucy. He accompanied King Philippe II of France with his father to the castles of Loches and Chinon in 1205. Hugues died in 1230. His wife Eléonore remarried to Robert de Saint-Clair.

He is known to have had the following children.

Jean de Châteauneuf (died with issue)
Eléonore de Châteauneuf (married Richard I de La Roche)
Marguerite de Châteauneuf (married Hervé III de Léon)
Yolande de Châteauneuf (married to Geoffroi de La Roche)
Agnès de Châteauneuf (a nun)
Luce de Châteauneuf (a nun)

References

1230 deaths